Madeley is a surname. Notable people with the surname include:

 Anna Madeley (born 1976), actress
 Chloe Madeley (born 1987), television presenter
 Darrin Madeley (born 1968), ice hockey player
 Paul Madeley (born 1944), footballer
 Richard Madeley (born 1956), television presenter
Ruth Madeley (born 1987), actress
 Vincent Madeley Harris (1913–1988), bishop